Bhujel, also called Bujhyal, is a Chepangic language of Greater Magaric Branch spoken in central Nepal.  It is a semi-tonal language, employing a complex array of affixes. It is believed that their original homeland was Nisi-Buji area of Baglung. In addition, Bhujel term is also the clan name of various ethnic groups including Brahmin, Chhetri & Magar. Bhujel people normally are with Mongoloid features rather than with Caucasoid features. Due to the social structure & social development, This term has been the identity of many other ethnic people too.

Geographical distribution
Bhujel is spoken in the following villages of Nepal (Ethnologue).

Tanahun District, Gandaki Zone: Kulmun, Arthumpka, Andimul, and Baniyatar
Gorkha District, Gandaki Zone: Beltar
Nawalparasi District, Lumbini Zone: Dhodeni
Chitwan District, Narayani Zone: Chanaute

Dialects
Ethnologue lists the following dialects of Bhujel.

Kulmun
Arthumpka
Andimul
Baniyatar
Beltar
Dhodeni
Chanaute

References

Magaric languages
Languages of Nepal